Zhang Zhiqing (born October 14, 1981 in Qingdao, Shandong) is a female Chinese handball player who competed at the 2004 Summer Olympics.

In 2004, she finished eighth with the Chinese team in the women's competition. She did not play in a match, but was a reserve player.

External links
profile 

1981 births
Living people
Handball players at the 2004 Summer Olympics
Olympic handball players of China
Chinese female handball players
Sportspeople from Qingdao
Handball players from Shandong
Handball players at the 2006 Asian Games
Asian Games competitors for China